Aarón Salazar Arias (born 15 May 1999) is a Costa Rican footballer who plays as a defender for Herediano and the Costa Rica national team.

Career
Salazar joined the youth academy of Herediano at the age of 7. He made his professional debut with Herediano in a 2–1 Liga FPD loss to Municipal Pérez Zeledón on 17 December 2017. He joined San Carlos on loan for 2 seasons, and after a successful stint was called back to the Herediano senior team.

International career
Salazar debuted with the senior Costa Rica national team in a 4–0 friendly loss to the United States on 10 June 2021.

Personal life
Salazar's uncle, Robert Arias, was also a professional footballer who represented the Costa Rica national team.

Honours
Herediano
Costa Rican Primera División: 2017 Verano, 2019 Apertura
Supercopa de Costa Rica: 2020

San Carlos
Costa Rican Primera División: 2019 Clausura

References

External links
 

1998 births
Living people
People from Heredia (canton)
Costa Rican footballers
Costa Rica international footballers
Costa Rica youth international footballers
Association football defenders
C.S. Herediano footballers
A.D. San Carlos footballers
Liga FPD players